Hla Maung Shwe (born 29 February 1956) is the former presidential adviser to President Thein Sein, serving as part of the political advisory group from April 2011 to April 2015. He also served as a senior advisor to the Myanmar Peace Center and as a secretary in the Union Peace Dialogue Joint Committee (UPDJC) under former president Thein Sein. He has continued to advise the government's peace team under Aung San Suu Kyi's government-led administration.

In November 2022, he was awarded the title of Wunna Kyawhtin, the country’s highest national honor for civil servants, by the military government.

References

External links

 Egress's Hla Hla Maung Shwe Interview

Living people
People from Yangon Region
Burmese politicians
1956 births